The Roof may refer to:
The Roof (band), an American rock band from Pittsburgh, PA
"The Roof (Back in Time)",  a song by Mariah Carey
The Roof (1956 film), an Italian film directed by Vittorio De Sica
The Roof (1933 film), a British film

See also
Roof (disambiguation)